The Francisco I. Madero Refinery is an oil refinery located in Ciudad Madero, Tamaulipas, "founded in 1914 by the company El Águila", is currently owned and operated by Pemex, and is one of six refineries of Mexico.

References 

Oil refineries in Mexico